James Reams (born January 10, 1956) is an American guitarist and member of the musical group James Reams & The Barnstormers. He has performed for over 20 years and is widely known as an "Ambassador of Bluegrass" for his dedication to bluegrass and oldtime music.

Biography
Originally from Kentucky and moved to Brooklyn, he continued to perform and record blue grass and old time music and created a festival in New York City, a one of a kind event that offers workshops and performances in bluegrass and old time music. During his music career, he has earned nicknames because of his efforts, Reams has been called the "Father of Brooklyn Bluegrass" and "Kentucky Songbird". Being from Kentucky, he was surrounded by music enthusiasts and musicians that have influenced his music. He currently resides in Litchfield Park, Arizona.

Bluegrass Oldtime Music Jamboree
In 1998, James Reams organized the Park Slope Bluegrass Oldtime Music Jamboree, an annual festival in Brooklyn, New York, at the Brooklyn Society of Ethical Culture Meeting House.

Discography
 1994: Kentucky Songbird (Leghorn Music)
 2000: The Blackest Crow (Mountain Redbird Music)
 2000: The Mysterious Redbirds (Mountain Redbird Music)
 2001: Barnstormin''' (Copper Creek Records)
 2002: James Reams, Walter Hensley & The Barons of Bluegrass (Copper Creek Records)
 2005: Troubled Times (Mountain Redbird Music) with the Barnstormers
 2006: Wild Card (Mountain Redbird Music)
 2011: One Foot In The Honky Tonk (Mountain Redbird Music) with the Barnstormers
 2016: Rhyme & Season (Mountain Redbird Music)
 2022: Like A Flowing River & Soundtrack Album'' (Mountain Redbird Music)

References

External links
 illustrated James Reams Discography
 Discography Mysterious Redbirds (Tom Paley, James Reams, and Bill Christophersen)
 James Reams official website

1956 births
American bluegrass guitarists
American male guitarists
Bluegrass musicians from Kentucky
Musicians from Brooklyn
Guitarists from Arizona
Living people
People from Litchfield Park, Arizona
Guitarists from Kentucky
Guitarists from New York (state)
20th-century American guitarists
Country musicians from New York (state)
Country musicians from Kentucky
Country musicians from Arizona
20th-century American male musicians